Nicolas Laspalles (born 27 November 1971) is a retired French footballer who played as a defender. He was a stalwart in Ligue 1, best known for his stints in Guingamp, Paris Saint-Germain, and Nantes.

Club career
Laspalles begun his professional career with Guingamp, and in his first two years they were promoted twice into the Ligue 1. He moved to Paris Saint-Germain after Guingamp got relegated in 1998. He then joined FC Nantes, winning the 2000–01 French Division 1 in his first season there. At the end of his career, he moved to U.S. Lecce, but after 6 months returned to Guingamp to finish his career and gain coaching experience.

Personal life
Nicolas' son, Roman Laspalles, followed in his father's footsteps and is a professional footballer as well.

Honours

Club
Guingamp
 UEFA Intertoto Cup: 1996

RC Lens
 Coupe de la Ligue: 1999

FC Nantes
 French Division 1: 2000–01
 Trophée Des Champions: 2001

References

External links
 

1971 births
Living people
People from Montargis
French footballers
Association football defenders
Ligue 1 players
Ligue 2 players
Championnat National players
Serie B players
En Avant Guingamp players
AJ Auxerre players
Paris Saint-Germain F.C. players
RC Lens players
FC Nantes players
U.S. Lecce players
Sportspeople from Loiret
Brittany international footballers
French expatriate footballers
Expatriate footballers in Italy
French expatriate sportspeople in Italy
Footballers from Centre-Val de Loire